Provincial Cultural Complex ( – Mojtame`-ye Farhengī Būstān va Lāīt) is a village in Fajr Rural District, in the Central District of Yazd County, Yazd Province, Iran. At the 2006 census, its population was 19, in 5 families.

References 

Populated places in Yazd County